Meynell is the name of:

 Alice Meynell (1847–1922), wife of Wilfrid Meynell
 Francis Meynell (1891–1975), poet and printer, son of Alice and Wilfrid Meynell
 Godfrey Meynell (1904–1935), army officer, awarded posthumous VC
 Hugo Meynell (1735–1808), politician and fox-hunter
 Hugo Francis Meynell Ingram (1822–1871), politician, greatgrandson of Hugo Meynell
 Hugo Anthony Meynell (1936–2021), English Christian philosopher, son of Godfrey Meynell
 Rhys Meynell (born 1988), footballer
 Viola Meynell (1885–1956), writer, daughter of Alice and Wilfrid Meynell
 Wilfrid Meynell  (1852–1948), newspaper publisher

Surnames from given names